Tico Tico may refer to:

 Tico-Tico (born 1973), professional name of Mozambican football striker Manuel José Luís Bucuane
 "Tico-Tico no Fubá", a 1917 Brazilian choro song composed by Zequinha de Abreu